Kronom or Kronum is a suburb of Kumasi and a town in the Suame Municipality in the Ashanti Region of Ghana.

References 

Ashanti Region
Communities in Ghana